Dimitrios Grafas (born 1935) is a Greek footballer. He played in one match for the Greece national football team in 1957.

References

External links
 

1935 births
Living people
Greek footballers
Greece international footballers
Place of birth missing (living people)
Association footballers not categorized by position